Marko Petković (born 3 March 1989) is a Montenegrin water polo player. He competed in the 2020 Summer Olympics.

References

1989 births
Living people
Sportspeople from Belgrade
People from Herceg Novi
Water polo players at the 2020 Summer Olympics
Montenegrin male water polo players
Olympic water polo players of Montenegro